"Somewhere Inside" first appeared in Tiësto's In Search of Sunrise 6: Ibiza compilation, and was titled "Somewhere Inside of Me", but according to its appearance with singer-songwriter Julie Thompson in the Elements of Life World Tour (DVD), the song is titled "Somewhere Inside". Upon release, it charted number 9 in the Netherlands.

Formats and track listings
12" Vinyl
Magik Muzik, Maelstrom Records 12" Vinyl
 "Somewhere Inside" (Original Mix)–9:52
 "Somewhere Inside" (Andy Duguid Remix)–8:03

Personnel
 Artwork and Design: Hugo de Graaf
 Composer(s): D.J. Waakop Reijers-Fraaij, Julie Thompson & Tiësto
 Presenter: Tiësto
 Writer(s): Julie Thompson & Tiësto

Charts

Official versions
 Original Mix (9:52)
 Andy Duguid Remix (8:03)

Release history

References

Tiësto songs
2007 songs
2008 singles
Songs written by Tiësto